The 1940 Connecticut gubernatorial election was held on November 5, 1940. Democratic nominee Robert A. Hurley defeated incumbent Republican Raymond E. Baldwin with 49.54% of the vote.

General election

Candidates
Major party candidates
Robert A. Hurley, Democratic
Raymond E. Baldwin, Republican

Other candidates
Jasper McLevy, Socialist
Joseph Mackay, Socialist Labor
Michael A. Russo, Communist

Results

References

1940
Connecticut
Gubernatorial